The Fiat 500, commonly known as "Topolino", is an Italian city car produced and manufactured by Fiat from 1936 to 1955.

The name Topolino is Italian and translates literally as "little mouse", but is also the Italian name for Mickey Mouse.

History

The Topolino was one of the smallest cars in the world at the time of its production. Launched in 1936, three models were produced until 1955, all with only minor mechanical and cosmetic changes. It was equipped with a 569 cc four-cylinder, side-valve, water-cooled engine mounted in front of the front axle (later an overhead valve motor), and so was a full-scale car rather than a cyclecar. The radiator was located behind the engine which made possible a lowered aerodynamic nose profile at a time when competitors had a flat, nearly vertical grille. The shape of the car's front allowed exceptional forward visibility.

Rear suspension initially used quarter-elliptic rear springs, but buyers frequently squeezed four or five people into the nominally two-seater car, and in later models the chassis was extended at the rear to allow for more robust semi-elliptic springs.

With horsepower of about 13 bhp, its top speed was about 85 km/h (53 mph), and it could achieve fuel consumption of about 6 litres per 100 km of petrol (39.2 mpgus). The target price given when the car was planned was 5,000 lire. In the event the price at launch was 9,750 lire, though the decade was one of falling prices in several parts of Europe and later in the 1930s the Topolino was sold for about 8,900 lire. Despite being more expensive than first envisioned, the car was competitively priced. Nearly 520,000 were sold.

Three models were produced. Model A and B shared the same body, but the engine of model B had 16 hp, compared to the 13 hp of Model A. Model A was produced from 1937 to 1948, while B was produced in 1948 and 1949. Model A was offered as a 2-door saloon, 2-door convertible saloon (saloon with folding roof) and a 2-door van, while Model B also introduced a 3-door estate under the name 500 B Giardiniera ("estate car").

The Giardiniera was at the beginning only available as a so-called woodie, with an outside ash frame being used instead of steel, and was available in seven metallic colors. When it was later renamed Belvedere, the wood was replaced with metal. This model as well as the regular two-seater Convertible-Limousine were also produced in France by Simca as the Simca 5, and in Germany by the German Fiat subsidiary NSU-Fiat.

Model C was introduced in 1949 with a restyled body and the same engine as the Model B, and was offered in 2-door saloon, 2-door convertible saloon, 3-door estate and 2-door van body styles. In 1952, the Giardiniera was renamed Belvedere ("A turret or other raised structure offering a pleasant view of the surrounding area", referring to its sunroof). Model C was produced until 1955.

In 1955 the larger rear-wheel-drive Fiat 600 was launched by Fiat and that would become the design basis for the new Fiat 500, the Nuova 500. These two models ended up replacing the original 500.

Gallery

References

Notes

Bibliography

External links

Fiat 500 History - Gizmohighway Auto Guide
Jay Leno talks about his Topolino
"Soviet-italian comic car AHCHOO-2"

500 Topolino
1930s cars
1940s cars
1950s cars
Cars introduced in 1936
City cars
Coupés
Convertibles
Station wagons
Vans